The Rivière des Grands Méchins is a tributary on the south coast of the St. Lawrence River where it flows into the municipality of Les Méchins. It flows northwards in the Chic-Choc Mountains, in the canton of Cherbourg (municipality of Saint-Jean-de-Cherbourg), then the canton of Dalibaire (municipality of Méchins), in the La Matanie Regional County Municipality (MRC), in the administrative region of Bas-Saint-Laurent, in Quebec, in Canada.

Geography 
The Grands Méchins river takes its source from a small lake among the Petits Chic-Chocs lakes and mountain streams located in the eastern part of the canton of Cherbourg, in the Chic-Chocs mountains, in the Gaspé peninsula.

From its source, the Grands Méchins river flows over  divided into the following segments:
  eastward in the canton of Cherbourg, up to the limit of the canton of Dalibaire (municipality of Méchins);
  north-east in a deep valley, up to a bend in the river;
  north-west in a deep valley, up to the confluence of the rivière des Grands Méchins Ouest;
  north in a deep valley, crossing at the end of the segment in the middle of the village of Méchins and passing under the route 132 bridge, up to its confluence.

Anse des Méchins extends  on the coast of the estuary of Saint Lawrence, between the cap Le Gros Machins (west side) and Cap des Méchins (east side). The mountain of Ilets, located east of the village of Méchins, dominates the cove of Méchins.

Toponymy 
The term Méchin constitutes a family name of French origin.

The toponym Rivière des Grands Méchins was formalized on December 5, 1968, at the Commission de toponymie du Québec.

See also 

 List of rivers of Quebec

References 

Rivers of Gaspésie–Îles-de-la-Madeleine
Rivers of Bas-Saint-Laurent